Cuyanopuga is a monotypic genus of ammotrechid camel spiders, first described by Hernán Iuri in 2021. Its single species, Cuyanopuga bilobata is distributed in Argentina.

References 

Solifugae
Arachnid genera
Monotypic arachnid genera